The Randolph W. Bromery Center for the Arts at the University of Massachusetts Amherst (FAC) is an arts center located just north of downtown Amherst, Massachusetts and contains a concert hall and a contemporary art gallery. The building is a 646-foot-long bridge of studio art space, raised up 30 feet from the ground creating a monumental gateway for a campus.

The Fine Arts Center serves as a cultural library and regional resource center for the citizens of the Pioneer Valley and the students and faculty from the University of Massachusetts. It also attracts scholars, faculty, students, and families interested in relocating to a community with this type of rich environment.

History
In the late 1960s, Kevin Roche and John Dinkeloo were asked to design first-class art, music, and theater spaces for the sons and daughters of working men and women of Massachusetts. The structure was constructed between 1972 and 1974 and opened in 1975.

Description
The Fine Arts Center is a 646-foot-long and 66 foot-high, Brutalist, poured stereo metric concrete, partially bridge-like structure, which are reflected in the nearby pond.

This venue is accessible according to the Americans with Disabilities Act.

Mission statement
The Fine Arts Center seeks to engage and inspire the campus and regional communities in the arts through a broad array of exemplary performances, exhibitions, and educational programs.

Since its founding in 1975, the Fine Arts Center has been a central force in the cultural, social and academic life of the university, the Five College campuses, and the Pioneer Valley of Western Massachusetts. The Fine Arts Center's combination of educational, visual, and performing arts programs not only makes it unique, but also helps meet the diverse needs of scholars, faculty, students, alumni and the broader community.

Performance venues

Tillis Performance Hall
The 2000-seat performance hall within the Fine Arts building was the main venue on the campus before the Mullins Center was opened in 1993.

The hall is still active with performances by a variety of musical genres and other acts from around the world. Of the 30,000 people who attended shows in 2012, 68 percent were from Hampshire County, 13 percent were from Franklin County and 6 percent came from Hampden County. The other 4,000 attendees came from southern New Hampshire and Vermont, the area surrounding Hartford, Connecticut, Worcester County and the Berkshires.

Musical acts and shows are attended by a collection of college students, local residents and families.

The performance space was renamed from the Concert Hall to the Tillis Performance Hall in October of 2021. 

This venue features: 
 Dance floor
 Dressing rooms
 Fly space
 Green room
 Loading dock
 Movie screen/projection capabilities
 Orchestra pit
 Piano
 Sound system
 WiFi

Visual art museums and galleries
 University Museum of Contemporary Art

References

External links

 Upcoming events at the FAC

University of Massachusetts Amherst buildings
University and college buildings completed in 1975
Brutalist architecture in Massachusetts
Music venues in Massachusetts
Performing arts centers in Massachusetts
1975 establishments in Massachusetts